Accounting Chamber is an audit body of the Verkhovna Rada and the supreme audit institution of Ukraine. The chamber's main purpose is to provide a control over use of funds of the State Budget of Ukraine (Article 98, Constitution of Ukraine). The role of the chamber in the Soviet times was performed by the Workers-Peasants Inspection of the USSR.

Description
The composition of the Accounting Chamber includes the Chairman of the Accounting Chamber and members of the Accounting Chamber: First Deputy, Deputy Chairman, chief inspectors and the Secretary of the Accounting Chamber. All of them are also known as the Collegiate of the Accounting Chamber (or Board of the Accounting Chamber). The chamber has its own secretarial body, apparatus, and has a great degree of independence from other organs of the state administration. Members of the chamber cannot be members of parliament, government, employed in commercial activities, perform other work concurrently except for teaching, research and other creative activities during after hours.

Chairperson
 1996-2011 Valentyn Symonenko
 2011-2012 Oleksandr Yaremenko (acting)
 2012–present Roman Mahuta

See also

External links

Ukraine
Verkhovna Rada
Supreme audit institutions